Nena de Brennecke (born 1883) was an Argentinean sculptor and mural painter known for her WPA commissions for post offices.

Early life and education 
Born in Argentina, she studied at the Slade School of Fine Art in London and with Henri Matisse in France. She married Dr. Ernest de Brennecke in London, they moved to Poughkeepsie, NY, where they divorced seven year later.

Career 
De Brennecke worked extensively on the Board of Directors Room at the Colorado Business Bank located in downtown Denver. She created bronze entrance doors decorated with Native American dancers, designed elevator doors, and created a sculpture. She created facade sculpture of the Motor Bus Terminal in Denver now demolished. She did exterior terracotta and bronze reliefts for the Railway Savings Bank in Pueblo, Colorado. De Brennecke was a founding member of the Denver Artists Guild in 1928.

In the 1930s de Brennecke relocated to Brooklyn, where the WPA commissioned her to do decorate post offices with carved wood reliefs.

Post office work 
 Racoon, Deer, and Fox (now lost), 1939, Coraopolis, PA
 Oil Refining, 1940, Paulsboro, NJ
 Dewberries, Drilling and Peaches, 1942, Hamlet, NC: 
 Stringing, Transplanting, and Harvesting, 1843, Windsor, CN

Dewberries, Drilling and Peaches, Hamlet North Carolina Post Office 
De Brennecke did three mahogany carvings entitled Dewberries, Drilling and Peaches at the Hamlet post office. She was $750 for her work. The works focus on Hamlet's role as an agricultural trade point, and depict important trade goods and processes. The murals depict only men conducting the picking and drilling, despite the fact that women often did much of this work. De Brennecke was working within the conventions of manliness proscribed by the WPA.

Exhibitions 
 Paris Salon 1914
 Denver Art Museum 1928
 Renaissance Society, University of Chicago 1831
 Brooklyn Museum 1935

Collections 
 Brooklyn Museum, NY
 Smithsonian American Art Museum
 Denver Public Library West Art Collection

References

External links 
 New Deal Art Registry: Nena De Brennecke

1883 births
Year of death missing
20th-century Argentine women artists 
Alumni of the Slade School of Fine Art
Artists from Colorado
Artists from Buenos Aires
Argentine muralists
People from Poughkeepsie, New York
Women muralists